Cross-Manhattan Expressway may refer to:

Trans-Manhattan Expressway, part of I-95
The unbuilt Lower Manhattan Expressway
The unbuilt Mid-Manhattan Expressway
The unbuilt Cross Harlem Expressway